Hey... Bo Diddley: In Concert is a 1986 live album by Bo Diddley, recorded on a European tour. His backing band for the performances on the album were Mainsqueeze, featuring guitarist Eric Bell, previously of Thin Lizzy, and Dick Heckstall-Smith, the jazz and blues saxophonist. Other members of the band included bass guitarist Keith Tillman, who, like Heckstall-Smith, had previously played with John Mayall & the Bluesbreakers; and drummer Leonard "Stretch" Stretching, who had performed with Marvin Gaye and Tom Waits.

The album was re-released in the USA in October 2001 on the Aim Trading Group label, and has also been released with different titles.

Track listing 
All tracks composed by Ellas McDaniel (Bo Diddley) except where stated.
"Intro / Bo Diddley Vamp"
"Doctor Jeckyll"
"Everleen"
"I Don't Know Where I've Been"
"You Can't Judge a Book" (Willie Dixon)
"Roadrunner"
"I'm a Man"
"Mona"

Personnel
Bo Diddley – vocals, guitar
Eric Bell – guitar
Dick Heckstall-Smith – alto saxophone
Dave "Munch" Moore – keyboards
Keith Tillman – bass guitar
Leonard "Stretch" Stretching – drums

References

Bo Diddley albums
1986 live albums